Hubert Guyard was a French cyclist. He competed in the tandem event at the 1928 Summer Olympics.

References

External links
 

Year of birth missing
Possibly living people
French male cyclists
Olympic cyclists of France
Cyclists at the 1928 Summer Olympics
Place of birth missing